Below are the squads for the 2014 AFF Championship, co-hosted by Singapore and Vietnam, which took place between 22 November and 20 December 2014.

Each team was allowed to register 22 official players (at least 2 goalkeepers) and one more reserve player.

Group A

Vietnam
Head coach:  Toshiya Miura

Philippines
Head coach:  Thomas Dooley

Indonesia
Head coach:  Alfred Riedl

Laos
Head coach:  David Booth

Group B

Singapore
Head coach:  Bernd Stange

Malaysia
Head coach: Dollah Salleh

Thailand
Head coach: Kiatisuk Senamuang

Myanmar
Head coach:  Radojko Avramovic

Statistics

Player representation by league system

References

AFF Championship squads
Squads